Aside was an English-language newsmagazine that used to be published from Chennai, India. It was founded in November 1977 by Abraham Eraly and ceased publication in 1997 because of financial difficulties. It was the first city magazine in India and was modeled on American city magazines, especially The New Yorker. It carried columns by Theodore Baskaran, Randor Guy and S. Muthiah. The magazine's subtitle was 'The Magazine of Madras'. In 1986 facing market pressures the magazine turned into a fortnightly news magazine.

References

1977 establishments in Tamil Nadu
1997 disestablishments in India
Defunct magazines published in India
English-language magazines published in India
News magazines published in India
Magazines established in 1977
Magazines disestablished in 1997
Mass media in Chennai
Biweekly magazines published in India